Willi Sohm (1913–1974) was an Austrian cinematographer.

Filmography

Bibliography
 Bergfelder, Tim. International Adventures: German Popular Cinema and European Co-Productions in the 1960s. Berghahn Books, 2005.

External links

1913 births
1974 deaths
Austrian cinematographers
People from Rohrbach District